The Palestinian Communist Party was a communist party in Mandate Palestine that came about from a split in 1922 of the Jewish Communist Party. The other factions from the split formed the Communist Party of Palestine. A major difference between the two parties was their attitude towards Zionism. The Communist Party of Palestine was more staunch in its condemnation of Zionism, whereas the Palestinian Communist Party was open towards some degree of cooperation with Zionists. Both parties were predominantly Jewish.  

In 1923, the two parties merged to form the unified Palestine Communist Party.

Sources
Fred Halliday, "Early Communism in Palestine", Journal of Palestine Studies, Vol. 7, No. 2 (Winter, 1978), pp. 162–169

References

1922 establishments in Mandatory Palestine
1923 disestablishments in Mandatory Palestine
Communist parties in Mandatory Palestine
Political parties established in 1922
Political parties disestablished in 1923